Pseudomussaenda is a genus of flowering plants belonging to the family Rubiaceae.

Its native range is Tropical Africa.

Species:

Pseudomussaenda angustifolia 
Pseudomussaenda flava 
Pseudomussaenda gossweileri 
Pseudomussaenda monteiroi 
Pseudomussaenda stenocarpa

References

Rubiaceae
Rubiaceae genera